The 2018 Oakland Athletics season was the 118th season for the Oakland Athletics franchise, all as members of the American League, and their golden jubilee of franchise  in Oakland (all at Oakland Coliseum). The A's were managed by Bob Melvin in his eighth year as manager of the A's. They played their home games at Oakland Coliseum as members of Major League Baseball's American League West Division.

The A's began the season on March 29 against the Los Angeles Angels and finished the season on September 30 against the Angels as well. On September 24, they clinched their first playoff berth since 2014. They went on to lose to the New York Yankees in the Wild Card Game, 7–2. Their 97 wins were the most of any Athletics team since 2002.

Offseason
The Oakland Athletics made a move to acquire outfielder Stephen Piscotty from the St. Louis Cardinals for minor leaguers Yairo Muñoz and Max Schrock on December 14, 2017. The trade allowed Piscotty to be closer to his mother who was suffering from ALS. His mother died on May 6, 2018.

Regular season

Game log

|- style=background:#cfc
|1||March 29|| Angels || 6–5 (11) || Hatcher (1–0) || Ramirez (0–1) ||—|| 27,764 || 1–0 || W1
|- style=background:#fcc
|2||March 30|| Angels || 1–2 || Skaggs (1–0) || Manaea (0–1) || Parker (1) || 27,665 || 1–1 || L1
|- style=background:#fcc
|3||March 31|| Angels || 3–8 || Shoemaker (1–0) || Mengden (0–1) ||—|| 17,012 || 1–2 || L2
|- style=background:#fcc
|4||April 1|| Angels || 4–7 || Ohtani (1–0) || Gossett (0–1) || Middleton (1) || 14,644 || 1–3 || L3
|- style=background:#cfc
|5||April 2|| Rangers || 3–1 || Hatcher (2–0) || Jepsen (0–1) || Treinen (1) || 7,416 || 2–3 || W1
|- style=background:#fcc
|6||April 3|| Rangers || 1–4 || Hamels (1–1) || Graveman (0–1) || Kela (1) || 9,157 || 2–4 || L1
|- style=background:#cfc
|7||April 4|| Rangers || 6–2 || Manaea (1–1) || Fister (1–1) ||—|| 7,908 || 3–4 || W1
|- style=background:#fcc
|8||April 5|| Rangers || 3–6 || Pérez (1–0) || Mengden (0–2) || Kela (2) || 10,132 || 3–5 || L1
|- style=background:#fcc
|9||April 6||@ Angels || 9–13 || Johnson (1–0) || Treinen (0–1) ||—|| 36,023 || 3–6 || L2
|- style=background:#cfc
|10||April 7||@ Angels || 7–3 || Triggs (1–0) || Ramírez (0–2) || Treinen (2) || 40,129 || 4–6 || W1
|- style=background:#fcc
|11||April 8||@ Angels || 1–7 || Ohtani (2–0) || Graveman (0–2) ||—|| 44,742 || 4–7 || L1
|- style=background:#fcc
|12||April 10||@ Dodgers || 0–4 || Ryu (1–0) || Manaea (1–2) || Jansen (2) || 41,243 || 4–8 || L2
|- style=background:#cfc
|13||April 11||@ Dodgers || 16–6 || Mengden (1–2) || Wood (0–2) ||—|| 49,394 || 5–8 || W1
|- style=background:#fcc
|14||April 13||@ Mariners || 4–7 || Altavilla (1–1) || Coulombe (0–1) || Díaz (5) || 25,352 || 5–9 || L1
|- style=background:#fcc
|15||April 14||@ Mariners || 8–10 || Bradford (1–0) || Graveman (0–3) || Díaz (6) || 29,013 || 5–10 || L1
|- style=background:#cfc
|16||April 15||@ Mariners || 2–1 || Manaea (2–2) || Hernández (2–2) || Treinen (3) || 25,882 || 6–10 || W1
|- style=background:#cfc
|17||April 16|| White Sox || 8–1 || Mengden (2–2) || López (0–2) ||—|| 7,479 || 7–10 || W2
|- style=background:#cfc
|18||April 17|| White Sox || 10–2 || Cahill (1–0) || González (0–3) ||—|| 46,028 || 8–10 || W3
|- style=background:#cfc
|19||April 18|| White Sox || 12–11 (14) || Trivino (1–0) || Shields (1–1) ||—|| 13,321 || 9–10 || W4
|- style=background:#fcc
|20||April 20|| Red Sox || 3–7 || Velázquez (3–0) || Graveman (0–4) ||—|| 23,473 || 9–11 || L1
|- style=background:#cfc
|21||April 21|| Red Sox || 3–0 || Manaea (3–2) || Sale (1–1) ||—|| 25,746 || 10–11 || W1
|- style=background:#cfc
|22||April 22|| Red Sox || 4–1 || Treinen (1–1) || Price (2–2) ||—|| 29,804 || 11–11 || W2
|- style=background:#cfc
|23||April 23||@ Rangers || 9–4 || Buchter (1–0) || Jepsen (0–3) ||—|| 17,060 || 12–11 || W3
|- style=background:#cfc
|24||April 24||@ Rangers || 3–2 || Triggs (2–0) || Hamels (1–4) || Casilla (1) || 19,391 || 13–11 || W4
|- style=background:#fcc
|25||April 25||@ Rangers || 2–4 || Chavez (1–0) || Graveman (0–5) || Kela (4) || 19,121 || 13–12 || L1
|- style=background:#cfc
|26||April 27||@ Astros || 8–1 || Manaea (4–2) || Keuchel (1–4) ||—|| 32,636 || 14–12 || W1
|- style=background:#fcc
|27||April 28||@ Astros || 0–11 || McCullers (4–1) || Mengden (2–3) ||—|| 41,493 || 14–13 || L1
|- style=background:#fcc
|28||April 29||@ Astros || 4–8 || Harris (1–1) || Cahill (1–1) ||—|| 39,131 || 14–14 || L2
|-

|- style=background:#fcc
|29||May 1||@ Mariners || 3–6 || Hernández (4–2) || Triggs (2–1) || Díaz (12) || 12,468 || 14–15 || L3
|- style=background:#cfc
|30||May 2||@ Mariners || 3–2 || Treinen (2–1) || Díaz (0–1) ||—|| 11,603 || 15–15 || W1
|- style=background:#fcc
|31||May 3||@ Mariners || 1–4 || Bradford (3–0) || Manaea (4–3) || Díaz (13) || 12,888 || 15–16 || L1
|- style=background:#cfc
|32||May 4|| Orioles || 6–4 || Trivino (2–0) || Brach (0–2) || Treinen (4) || 12,723 || 16–16 || W1
|- style=background:#cfc
|33||May 5|| Orioles || 2–0 (12) || Hatcher (3–0) || Araújo (1–3) ||—|| 24,612 || 17–16 || W2 
|- style=background:#cfc
|34||May 6|| Orioles || 2–1 || Triggs (3–1) || Cobb (0–4) || Treinen (5) || 17,112 || 18–16 || W3
|- style=background:#fcc
|35||May 7|| Astros || 2–16 || Keuchel (2–5) || Anderson (0–1) ||—|| 7,360 || 18–17 || L1
|- style=background:#fcc
|36||May 8|| Astros || 2–4 || McCullers (5–1) || Manaea (4–4) || Giles (4) || 9,675 || 18–18 || L2
|- style=background:#fcc
|37||May 9|| Astros || 1–4 || Cole (4–1) || Mengden (2–4) || Giles (5) || 18,044 || 18–19 || L3
|- style=background:#cfc
|38||May 11||@ Yankees || 10–5 || Graveman (1–5) || Gray (2–3) || Treinen (6) || 43,093 || 19–19 || W1
|- style=background:#fcc
|39||May 12||@ Yankees || 6–7 (11) || Cole (2–1) || Hatcher (3–1) ||—|| 41,859 || 19–20 || L1
|- style=background:#fcc
|40||May 13||@ Yankees || 2–6 || Severino (6–1) || Anderson (0–2) ||—|| 40,538 || 19–21 || L2
|- style=background:#cfc
|41||May 14||@ Red Sox || 6–5 || Manaea (5–4) || Porcello (5–1) || Treinen (7) || 35,249 || 20–21 || W1
|- style=background:#cfc
|42||May 15||@ Red Sox || 5–3 || Mengden (3–4) || Rodríguez (3–1) || Treinen (8) || 34,906 || 21–21 || W2
|- style=background:#fcc
|43||May 16||@ Red Sox || 4–6 || Sale (4–1) || Cahill (1–2) || Kimbrel (12) || 34,947 || 21–22 || L1
|- style=background:#cfc
|44||May 17||@ Blue Jays || 10–5 || Petit (1–0) || Sanchez (2–4) ||—|| 22,893 || 22–22 || W1
|- style=background:#cfc
|45||May 18||@ Blue Jays || 3–1 || Coulombe (1–1) || Estrada (2–4) || Treinen (9) || 21,703 || 23–22 || W2
|- style=background:#cfc
|46||May 19||@ Blue Jays || 5–4 || Pagan (1–0) || Clippard (4–1) || Treinen (10) || 35,786 || 24–22 || W3
|- style=background:#cfc
|47||May 20||@ Blue Jays || 9–2 || Mengden (4–4) || Biagini (0–3) ||—|| 30,676 || 25–22 || W4
|- style=background:#fcc
|48||May 22|| Mariners || 2–3 (10) || Vincent (3–1) || Petit (1–1) || Díaz (16) || 9,408 || 25–23 || L1
|- style=background:#fcc
|49||May 23|| Mariners || 0–1 || Gonzales (4–3) || Gossett (0–2) || Díaz (17) || 6,991 || 25–24 || L2
|- style=background:#cfc
|50||May 24|| Mariners || 4–3 || Petit (2–1) || Hernández (5–4) || Treinen (11) || 12,633 || 26–24 || W1
|- style=background:#fcc
|51||May 25|| Diamondbacks || 1–7 || Corbin (5–1) || Manaea (5–5) ||—|| 22,691 || 26–25 || L1
|- style=background:#cfc
|52||May 26|| Diamondbacks || 3–0 || Mengden (5–4) || Buchholz (0–1) ||—|| 17,580 || 27–25 || W1
|- style=background:#cfc
|53||May 27|| Diamondbacks || 2–1 || Montas (1–0) || Greinke (3–4) || Treinen (12) || 13,947 || 28–25 || W2
|- style=background:#fcc
|54||May 28|| Rays || 0–1 (13) || Stanek (1–0) || Hatcher (3–2) || Venters (1) || 10,881 || 28–26 || L1
|- style=background:#fcc
|55||May 29|| Rays || 3–4 || Snell (7–3) || Gossett (0–3) || Romo (1) || 7,521 || 28–27 || L2
|- style=background:#fcc
|56||May 30|| Rays || 0–6 || Eovaldi (1–0) || Manaea (5–6) ||—|| 6,705 || 28–28 || L3
|- style=background:#cfc
|57||May 31|| Rays || 7–3 || Mengden (6–4) || Stanek (1–1) || Treinen (13)|| 12,070 || 29–28 || W1
|-

|- style=background:#cfc
|58||June 1||@ Royals || 16–0 || Montas (2–0) || Kennedy (1–6) ||—|| 23,413 || 30–28 || W2
|- style=background:#fcc
|59||June 2||@ Royals || 4–5 || Hill (1–1) || Petit (2–2) || Herrera (13)|| 24,553 || 30–29 || L1
|- style=background:#cfc
|60||June 3||@ Royals || 5–1 || Trivino (3–0) || Junis (5–5) ||—|| 19,424 || 31–29 || W1
|- style=background:#fcc
|61||June 5||@ Rangers || 4–7 || Martin (1–1) || Trivino (3–1) || Kela (14)|| 19,470 || 31–30 || L1
|- style=background:#fcc
|62||June 6||@ Rangers || 2–8 || Colón (3–3) || Mengden (6–5) ||—|| 22,335 || 31–31 || L2
|- style=background:#cfc
|63||June 7|| Royals || 4–1 || Blackburn (1–0) || Hammel (2–6) ||Treinen (14)|| 7,963 || 32–31 || W1
|- style=background:#cfc
|64||June 8|| Royals || 7–2 || Montas (3–0) || Junis (5–6) || Trivino (1)|| 10,132 || 33–31 || W2
|- style=background:#fcc
|65||June 9|| Royals || 0–2 || Duffy (3–6) || Bassitt (0–1) || Herrera (14)|| 16,208 || 33–32 || L1
|- style=background:#cfc
|66||June 10|| Royals || 3–2 || Treinen (3–1) || Adam (0–1) ||—|| 15,548 || 34–32 || W1
|- style=background:#fcc
|67||June 12|| Astros || 3–6 || McCullers (8–3) || Mengden (6–6) ||Giles (11)|| 11,742 || 34–33 || L1
|- style=background:#fcc
|68||June 13|| Astros || 5–13 || Cole (8–1) || Blackburn (1–1) ||—|| 9,164 || 34–34 || L2
|- style=background:#fcc
|69||June 14|| Astros || 3–7 || Verlander (9–2) || Montas (3–1)  ||—|| 13,009 || 34–35 || L3
|- style=background:#fcc
|70||June 15|| Angels || 4–8 || Skaggs (6–4) || Bassitt (0–2) ||—|| 18,356 || 34–36 || L4
|- style=background:#cfc
|71||June 16|| Angels || 6–4 || Manaea (6–6) || Ramirez (2–3) || Treinen (15) || 19,185 || 35–36 || W1
|- style=background:#cfc
|72||June 17|| Angels || 6–5  (11)  || Treinen (4–1) || Jewell (0–1) ||—|| 21,217 || 36–36 || W2
|- style=background:#cfc 
|73||June 19||@ Padres || 4–2  (10)  || Trivino (4–1) || Cimber (3–3) || Treinen (16) || 37,485 || 37–36 || W3
|- style=background:#cfc
|74||June 20||@ Padres || 12–4 || Montas (4–1)  || Lucchesi (3–3) ||—|| 28,225 || 38–36 || W4
|- style=background:#bbb
| – ||June 21||@ White Sox || colspan="9"| Postponed (rain); Rescheduled for June 22 as part of a doubleheader.
|- style=background:#cfc
|75||June 22 (1)||@ White Sox || 11–2 || Manaea (7–6) || Shields (2–9) ||—|| 18,323 || 39–36 || W5
|- style=background:#fcc
|76||June 22 (2)||@ White Sox || 4–6 || Giolito (5–7)  || Bassitt (0–3) || Soria (11) || 18,323 || 39–37 || L1
|- style=background:#cfc
|77||June 23||@ White Sox || 7–6 || Trivino (5–1) || Minaya (0–2) || Treinen (17) || 20,457 || 40–37 || W1
|- style=background:#fcc
|78||June 24||@ White Sox || 3–10 || Rodon (1–2) || Blackburn (1–2)  ||—|| 21,908 || 40–38 || L1
|- style=background:#cfc
|79||June 25||@ Tigers || 5–4 || Trivino (6–1) || Greene (2–4) || Treinen (18) || 19,127 || 41–38 || W1
|- style=background:#cfc
|80||June 26||@ Tigers || 9–7 || Buchter (2–0) || Greene (2–5) || Treinen (19) || 22,809 || 42–38 || W2
|- style=background:#cfc
|81||June 27||@ Tigers || 3–0 || Bassitt (1–3) || Fiers (5–5) || Trivino (2) || 23,961 || 43–38 || W3
|- style=background:#cfc
|82||June 28||@ Tigers || 4–2 || Manaea (8–6) || Fulmer (3–7) || Treinen (20) || 28,866 || 44–38 || W4
|- style=background:#cfc
|83||June 29|| Indians || 3–1 || Blackburn (2–2) || Bauer (7–6) || Treinen (21) || 14,823 || 45–38 || W5
|- style=background:#cfc
|84||June 30|| Indians || 7–2 || Jackson (1–0) || Plutko (4–2) || Trivino (3) || 17,748 || 46–38 || W6
|-

|- style=background:#fcc
|85||July 1|| Indians || 3–15 || Clevinger (7–3) || Montas (4–2) ||—|| 16,164 || 46–39 || L1
|- style=background:#cfc
|86||July 3|| Padres || 6–2 || Pagan (2–0) || Richard (7–8) ||—|| 29,925 || 47–39 || W1
|- style=background:#cfc
|87||July 4|| Padres || 4–2 || Trivino (7–1) || Castillo (1–2) || Treinen (22) || 14,408 || 48–39 || W2
|- style=background:#fcc
|88||July 6||@ Indians || 4–10 || Carrasco (9–5) || Blackburn (2–3) ||—|| 34,633 || 48–40 || L1
|- style=background:#cfc
|89||July 7||@ Indians || 6–3  (11)  || Treinen (5–1) || Tomlin (0–5) ||—|| 33,195 || 49–40 || W1
|- style=background:#cfc
|90||July 8||@ Indians || 6–0 || Anderson (1–2) || Bieber (4–1) ||—|| 27,125 || 50–40 || W2
|- style=background:#cfc
|91||July 9||@ Astros || 2–0 || Montas (5–2) || Peacock (1–4) || Treinen (23) || 28,301 || 51–40 || W3
|- style=background:#fcc
|92||July 10||@ Astros || 5–6  (11)  || McHugh (5–0) || Treinen (5–2) ||—|| 34,585 || 51–41 || L1
|- style=background:#cfc
|93||July 11||@ Astros || 8–3 || Bassitt (2–3) || McCullers (10–4) ||—|| 41,119 || 52–41 || W1
|- style=background:#cfc
|94||July 12||@ Astros || 6–4 || Petit (3–2) || Devenski (2–2) || Trivino (4) || 38,900 || 53–41 || W2
|- style=background:#fcc
|95||July 13||@ Giants || 1–7 || Bumgarner (3–3) || Jackson (1–1) ||—|| 41,751 || 53–42 || L1
|- style=background:#cfc
|96||July 14||@ Giants || 4–3 || Petit (4–2) || Watson (2–3) || Treinen (24) || 41,970 || 54–42 || W1
|- style=background:#cfc
|97||July 15||@ Giants || 6–2 || Manaea (9–6) || Suarez (3–6) ||—|| 42,098 || 55–42 || W2
|- style=background:#bbcaff
|colspan="10"|89th All-Star Game in Washington, D.C.
|- style=background:#fcc
|98||July 20|| Giants || 1–5 || Rodríguez (5–1) || Jackson (1–2) ||—|| 45,606 || 55–43 || L1
|- style=background:#cfc
|99||July 21|| Giants || 4–3  (11)  || Petit (5–2) || Smith (0–1) ||—|| 56,310 || 56–43 || W1
|- style=background:#cfc
|100||July 22|| Giants || 6–5  (10)  || Familia (5–4) || Blach (6–6) ||—|| 44,374 || 57–43 || W2
|- style=background:#cfc
|101||July 23||@ Rangers || 15–3 ||Anderson (2–2) ||Hamels (5–9) ||—|| 18,744 || 58–43 || W3
|- style=background:#cfc
|102||July 24||@ Rangers || 13–10  (10)  || Familia (6–4) || Bibens-Dirkx (2–3)|| Treinen (25) || 18,249 || 59–43 || W4
|- style=background:#cfc
|103||July 25||@ Rangers || 6–5 ||Trivino (8–1) ||Leclerc (2–3) ||Treinen (26) || 20,549 || 60–43 || W5
|- style=background:#cfc
|104||July 26||@ Rangers || 7–6 || Cahill (2–2) || Colón (5–9) || Treinen (27) || 20,533 || 61–43 || W6
|- style=background:#fcc
|105||July 27||@ Rockies || 1–3 || Freeland (9–6) || Manaea (9–7) || Ottavino (4)|| 40,229 || 61–44 || L1
|- style=background:#fcc
|106||July 28||@ Rockies || 1–4 || Senzatela (4–3) || Anderson (2–3) || Davis (29) || 47,809 || 61–45 || L2
|- style=background:#fcc
|107||July 29||@ Rockies || 2–3 || Márquez (9–8) || Montas (5–3) ||Davis (30) || 41,988 || 61–46 || L3
|- style=background:#cfc
|108||July 30|| Blue Jays || 10–1 || Jackson (2–2) || Estrada (4–8) ||—|| 11,449 || 62–46 || W1
|- style=background:#cfc
|109||July 31|| Blue Jays || 6–2 || Cahill (3–2) || Gaviglio (2–4) ||—|| 17,325 || 63–46 || W2
|-

|- style=background:#cfc
|110||August 1|| Blue Jays || 8–3 || Manaea (10–7) || Stroman (4–8) ||—|| 17,058 || 64–46 || W3
|- style=background:#cfc
|111||August 3|| Tigers || 1–0  (13)  || Pagan (3–0) || Farmer (4–3) ||—|| 14,766 || 65–46 || W4
|- style=background:#cfc
|112||August 4|| Tigers || 2–1 || Jackson (3–2) || Zimmermann (4–4) || Treinen (28) || 33,668 || 66–46 || W5
|- style=background:#cfc
|113||August 5|| Tigers || 6–0 || Cahill (4–2) || Liriano (3–6) ||—|| 19,559 || 67–46 ||W6
|- style=background:#fcc
|114||August 7|| Dodgers || 2–4 || Hill (5–4) || Manaea (10–8) || Jansen (32) || 33,654 || 67–47 || L1
|- style=background:#cfc
|115||August 8|| Dodgers || 3–2 || Familia (7–4) || Chargois (2–3) || Treinen (29) || 32,062 || 68–47 || W1
|- style=background:#fcc
|116||August 10||@ Angels || 3–4 || Johnson (4–2) || Trivino (8–2) || Parker (11) || 42,722 || 68–48 || L1
|- style=background:#cfc
|117||August 11||@ Angels || 7–0 || Jackson (4–2) || Skaggs (8–8) ||—|| 39,425 || 69–48 || W1
|- style=background:#cfc
|118||August 12||@ Angels || 8–7 || Rodney (4–2) || Johnson (4–3) || Treinen (30) || 38,364 || 70–48 || W2
|- style=background:#cfc
|119||August 13|| Mariners || 7–6 || Manaea (11–8) || Gonzales (12–8) || Treinen (31) || 10,400 || 71–48 || W3
|- style=background:#cfc
|120||August 14|| Mariners || 3–2 || Fiers (8–6) || Hernández (8–11) || Treinen (32) || 17,419 || 72–48 || W4
|- style=background:#fcc
|121||August 15|| Mariners || 0–2  (12)  || Pazos (3–1) || Petit (5–3) || Díaz (47) || 17,078 || 72–49 || L1
|- style=background:#cfc
|122||August 17|| Astros || 4–3  (10)  || Treinen (6–2) || Sipp (2–1) ||—|| 23,535 || 73–49 || W1
|- style=background:#cfc
|123||August 18|| Astros || 7–1 || Cahill (5–2) || Keuchel (9–10) ||—|| 32,204 || 74–49 || W2
|- style=background:#fcc
|124||August 19|| Astros || 4–9 || Verlander (12–8) || Manaea (11–9) ||—|| 29,143 || 74–50 || L1
|- style=background:#cfc
|125||August 20|| Rangers || 9–0 || Fiers (9–6) || Colón (7–11) ||—|| 9,341 || 75–50 || W1
|- style=background:#cfc
|126||August 21|| Rangers || 6–0 || Anderson (3–3) || Jurado (2–3) ||—|| 11,579 || 76–50 || W2
|- style=background:#fcc
|127||August 22|| Rangers || 2–4 || Minor (10–6) || Jackson (4–3) || Leclerc (6) || 13,139 || 76–51 || L1
|- style=background:#fcc
|128||August 23||@ Twins || 4–6 || Busenitz (4–0) || Cahill (5–3) || Hildenberger (4) || 24,171 || 76–52 || L2
|- style=background:#cfc
|129||August 24||@ Twins || 7–1 || Manaea (12–9) || Odorizzi (5–8) ||—|| 22,568 || 77–52 || W1
|- style=background:#cfc
|130||August 25||@ Twins || 6–2 || Fiers (10–6) || Gonsalves (0–2) ||—|| 28,772 || 78–52 || W2
|- style=background:#cfc
|131||August 26||@ Twins || 6–2 || Buchter (3–0) || Berríos (11–9) ||—|| 23,318 || 79–52 || W3
|- style=background:#fcc
|132||August 27||@ Astros || 4–11 || Cole (12–5) || Anderson (3–4) ||—|| 43,171 || 79–53 || L1
|- style=background:#cfc
|133||August 28||@ Astros || 4–3 || Familia (8–4) || Osuna (1–2) || Treinen (33) || 33,136 || 80–53 || W1
|- style=background:#fcc
|134||August 29||@ Astros || 4–5 || Osuna (2–2) || Familia (8–5) ||—|| 32,926 || 80–54 || L1
|- style=background:#fcc
|135||August 30|| Mariners || 1–7 || LeBlanc (8–3) || Montas (5–4) ||—|| 10,844 || 80–55 || L2
|- style=background:#cfc
|136||August 31|| Mariners || 7–5 || Petit (6–3) || Leake (8–9) || Treinen (34) || 17,942 || 81–55 || W1
|-

|- style=background:#fcc
|137||September 1|| Mariners || 7–8 || Paxton (11–5) || Hendriks (0–1) ||Díaz (51) || 28,760 || 81–56 || L1
|- style=background:#cfc
|138||September 2|| Mariners || 8–2 || Jackson (5–3) || Hernández (8–13) || Treinen (35) || 21,497 || 82–56 || W1
|- style=background:#cfc
|139||September 3|| Yankees || 6–3 || Cahill (6–3) || Sabathia (7–6) || Treinen (36) || 40,546 || 83–56 || W2
|- style=background:#fcc
|140||September 4|| Yankees || 1–5 || Robertson (8–3) || Rodney (4–3) ||—|| 17,536 || 83–57 || L1
|- style=background:#cfc
|141||September 5|| Yankees || 8–2 || Fiers (11–6) || Severino (17–7) ||—|| 21,004 || 84–57 || W1
|- style=background:#cfc
|142||September 7|| Rangers || 8–4 || Petit (7–3) || Gallardo (8–4) ||—|| 15,572 || 85–57 || W2
|- style=background:#cfc
|143||September 8|| Rangers || 8–6 || Buchter (4–0) || Martin (1–4) || Treinen (37) || 20,504 || 86–57 || W3
|- style=background:#cfc
|144||September 9|| Rangers || 7–3 || Kelley (2–0) || Jurado (2–5) ||—|| 27,932 || 87–57 || W4
|- style=background:#cfc
|145||September 11||@ Orioles || 3–2 || Fiers (12–6) || Wright (3–2) || Familia (18) || 9,141 || 88–57 || W5
|- style=background:#cfc
|146||September 12||@ Orioles || 10–0 || Mengden (7–6) || Cashner (4–15) ||—|| 10,480 || 89–57 || W6
|- style=background:#fcc
|147||September 13||@ Orioles || 3–5 || Bundy (8–14) || Anderson (3–5) || Givens (7) || 11,714 || 89–58 || L1
|- style=background:#cfc
|148||September 14||@ Rays || 2–1 (10) || Treinen (7–2) || Schultz (2–1) ||—|| 11,549 || 90–58 || W1
|- style=background:#fcc
|149||September 15||@ Rays || 5–7 || Kittredge (2–2) || Familia (8–6) || Romo (20) || 15,154 || 90–59 || L1
|- style=background:#fcc
|150||September 16||@ Rays || 4–5 || Kittredge (3–2) || Fiers (12–7) || Romo (21) || 13,197 || 90–60 || L2
|- style=background:#fcc
|151||September 18|| Angels || 7–9 || Ramirez (6–5) || Trivino (8–3) || Buttrey (4) || 15,031 || 90–61 || L3
|- style=background:#cfc
|152||September 19|| Angels || 10–0 || Anderson (4–5) || Peña (3–5) || — || 16,425 || 91–61 || W1
|- style=background:#cfc
|153||September 20|| Angels || 21–3 || Jackson (6–3) || Shoemaker (2–2) || — || 17,217 || 92–61 || W2
|- style=background:#cfc
|154||September 21|| Twins || 7–6 (10) || Treinen (8–2) || Magill (3–3) || — || 27,558 || 93–61 || W3
|- style=background:#cfc
|155||September 22|| Twins || 3–2 || Treinen (9–2) || Hildenberger (4–5) || — || 36,731 || 94–61 || W4
|- style=background:#fcc
|156||September 23|| Twins || 1–5 || Gibson (9–13) || Cahill (6–4) || May (1) || 35,754 || 94–62 || L1
|- style=background:#cfc
|157||September 24||@ Mariners || 7–3 || Buchter (5–0) || Armstrong (0–1) || — || 16,491 || 95–62 || W1
|- style=background:#fcc
|158||September 25||@ Mariners || 8–10 (11) || Colomé (7–5) || Pagan (3–1) || — || 12,791 || 95–63 || L1
|- style=background:#cfc
|159||September 26||@ Mariners || 9–3 || Buchter (6–0) || Hernández (8–14) ||—|| 13,727 || 96–63 || W1
|- style=background:#fcc
|160||September 28||@ Angels || 5–8 || Cole (4–2) || Fiers (12–8) || Robles (2) || 35,041 || 96–64 || L1
|- style=background:#cfc
|161||September 29||@ Angels || 5–2 || Cahill (7–4) || Skaggs (8–10) || Treinen (38) || 43,762 || 97–64 || W1
|- style=background:#fcc
|162||September 30||@ Angels || 4–5 || Bridwell (3–3) || Hatcher (3–3) ||—|| 36,892 || 97–65 || L1
|-

|- style="text-align:center;"
| Legend:       = Win       = Loss       = PostponementBold = A's team member

American League West

American League Wild Card

Record against opponents

Postseason

Postseason Game log

|- bgcolor= Pink
|  1 || October 3 || @ Yankees || 2−7 || Betances (1−0) || Hendriks (0−1) || — || Yankee Stadium || 49,620 || 0–1

Postseason rosters

| style="text-align:left" |
Pitchers: 15 Emilio Pagán 16 Liam Hendriks 31 Shawn Kelley 32 Jeurys Familia 36 Yusmeiro Petit 37 Edwin Jackson 39 Blake Treinen 52 Ryan Buchter 56 Fernando Rodney 57 J. B. Wendelken 62 Lou Trivino
Catchers: 19 Josh Phegley 21 Jonathan Lucroy 
Infielders: 1 Franklin Barreto 8 Jed Lowrie 10 Marcus Semien 18 Chad Pinder 26 Matt Chapman 28 Matt Olson
Outfielders: 20 Mark Canha 22 Ramón Laureano 23 Matt Joyce 25 Stephen Piscotty 38 Nick Martini 
Designated hitters: 2 Khris Davis
|- valign="top"

Roster

Farm system

Notes

References

External links
2018 Oakland Athletics season at Baseball Reference

Oakland Athletics seasons
Oakland Athletics
2010s in Oakland, California
Oakland Athletics